is a railway station in the city of Iiyama, Nagano Prefecture, Japan operated by East Japan Railway Company (JR East).

Lines
Hachisu Station is served by the Iiyama Line, and is 14.6 kilometers from the starting point of the line at Toyono Station.

Station layout
The station consists of one side platform serving one bi-directional track. The station is unattended.

History
Hachisu Station opened on 20 October 1921. With the privatization of Japanese National Railways (JNR) on 1 April 1987, the station came under the control of JR East.

Surrounding area
Chikuma River

See also
 List of railway stations in Japan

References

External links

 JR East station information 

Railway stations in Nagano Prefecture
Iiyama Line
Railway stations in Japan opened in 1921
Iiyama, Nagano